Poa alpina, commonly known as alpine meadow-grass or alpine bluegrass, is a species of grass with a primarily holarctic distribution.

It is noted for being pseudoviviparous: in place of seeds, it sometimes reproduces asexually, creating new plantlets in the spikelets.

References

alpina
Holarctic flora
Plants described in 1753
Taxa named by Carl Linnaeus